Friends & Love...A Chuck Mangione Concert is a double album recorded live at the Eastman Theatre in Rochester, New York on May 9, 1970, and released by Mercury Records. It features Chuck Mangione on flugelhorn; the Rochester Philharmonic Orchestra conducted by  Mangione; Don Potter; Bat McGrath; Gap Mangione; Stanley Watson; Marvin Stamm; and Gerry Niewood. Lyrics were written by Bat McGrath; orchestrations and arrangements were by Mangione. The album was nominated for a Grammy Award in 1971.

The album "blended jazz, rock, folk and classical elements." The first track, "Hill Where the Lord Hides", was subsequently released as a single and appeared on the Billboard Hot 100 in 1971.

Track listing
"Hill Where the Lord Hides" (7:12)
"The Feel of a Vision" (8:26)
"Songs from the Valley of the Nightingale" (6:51)
"And In the Beginning" (9:41)
"Friends & Love" (24:45)
"Friends & Love Encore" (5:52)

Personnel
Chuck Mangione - flugelhorn, conductor, arrangements, orchestration 
Rochester Philharmonic Orchestra
Don Potter - guitar, voice
Bat McGrath - guitarrón, voice
Gap Mangione - electric piano
Stanley Watson - guitar
Al Porcino, Marvin Stamm, Paul McRae, Richard F. Jones, Vincent DiMartino - trumpet
Chris Vadala, Larry Covelli - tenor saxophone
Gerry Niewood - soprano saxophone, alto saxophone, flute
Ned Corman - baritone saxophone, flute, alto flute
Steve Gadd - drums
Tony Levin - electric bass
Bill Cahn, Bob Becker - percussion
Eileen Malone - harp
Brad Warnaar, George Nemeth, Milan Yancich, Morris Secon - horns
Bill Reichenbach, David Richey, George J. Osborn, Tony Dechario - trombone
Edward De Matteo, Michael Leiter, Oscar Zimmermann, Robert Zimmermann - string bass
Hrant Tatian, Peter Wukovitz, Robert E. Taylor, Sylvia Thelen - cello
Michael Webster, Stanley Gaulke - clarinet
Katherine T. Levy, Nancy Webster - flute
Paul F. Philips, Stephen Paulson - bassoon
Jonathan Parkes, Robert Sprenkle - oboe
Cherry Beauregard - tuba
John Beck - timpani
Abram Boone, Harry Schatz, Herbert Brill, Judit M. Hradetzky, Lorene C. Field, Sharon Laird, Shirley Reynolds, Carol Tatian, Cynthia Hammer, Herman Surasky, Loraine Messick, Ralph Rozzi, Yong Ki Ahn - violin
Alfred L. Drucker, Elizabeth Weiss, Herman Rudin, Minna Shklar, Thomas A. Dumm - viola

References

External links
The Official Chuck Mangione Website
Friends and Love at Allmusic

1970 live albums
Chuck Mangione albums
Mercury Records albums
Music of Rochester, New York